Yvan Joseph Rene Joly (born February 6, 1960) is a Canadian former professional ice hockey forward. Joly played the majority of his career with North American minor league teams, except for two games in the National Hockey League for the Montreal Canadiens.

Career statistics

External links

1960 births
Canadian ice hockey forwards
HC Ambrì-Piotta players
HC Gardena players
Ice hockey people from Ontario
Indianapolis Checkers players
Living people
Maine Mariners players
Montreal Canadiens draft picks
Montreal Canadiens players
Nova Scotia Voyageurs players
Ottawa 67's players